Scolopendra alternans, commonly known as the Haitan giant centipede, Caribbean giant centipede, and Florida Keys centipede, is a species of large centipede in the subfamily Scolopendrinae. The species was involved in widespread news coverage after an incident in John Pennekamp Coral Reef State Park, in which a specimen of the extremely rare rim rock crown snake (Tantilla oolitica) died of asphyxiation while trying to eat a Scolopendra alternans, which also died.

Appearance 
Scolopendra alternans is a large species of centipede, and can grow up to 17–19 cm in length. Their colouration is generally brownish or reddish, but it varies greatly depending on location. Some American forms are yellow to orange in colour. Morphological features also vary depending on location.

Distribution 
Scolopendra alternans is found in Puerto Rico, Cuba, Guadeloupe, Venezuela the Bahamas, Hispaniola, the Antilles, the British Virgin Islands, and Florida. They have also been reported as far north as Georgia.

Notes

References

External links 
 Sketchfab.com - Rim Rock Crown Snake and Centipede 3D Model

alternans